Jabal Maomah(جبل مومة  ) is a mountain of the As-Sarawat ranges in the 'Asir Region of Saudi Arabia near the town of Tanomah. It is located at 19°0′25″N and 42°5′55″e.
Overlooking the Tihama coastal plain and Guentan Valley, and with its height of 2639 m (8658 ft), the picturesque scenery of Jabal Maomah has made it one of the most popular parks frequented by Saudi vacationers due to the beauty of the place.

The name Jabal Maomah means Mount Maternity  in Arabic.

References

Maomah